The Puerta de Bisagra Nueva ("The New Bisagra Gate") is the best known city gate of Toledo, Spain. 

The gate is of Moorish origin, but the main part was built in 1559 by Alonso de Covarrubias. It carries the coat of arms of the emperor Charles V. It superseded the Puerta Bisagra Antigua as the main entrance to the city.

See also
Puerta de Bisagra Antigua

References

Bisagra nueva
Buildings and structures completed in 1559
Infrastructure completed in the 16th century